Ligue Nationale du Football Amateur commonly known as the LNFA, is an Algerian governing body that runs the second-highest division in the Algerian football league system. It was founded in 2010 and serves under the authority of the Algerian Football Federation. The president of the league is Ali Malek.
The league is responsible for overseeing, organizing, and managing the Algerian Ligue 2.

See also 
 Ligue de Football Professionnel

References

External links
Ligue National de Football Amateur official site

 
 
Football governing bodies in Algeria
3
Alger
Association football clubs established in 2010
2010 establishments in Algeria